Cox is an unincorporated community in Macon County, in the U.S. state of Missouri.

History
A post office called Cox was established in 1887, and remained in operation until 1907. W. S. Cox, an early postmaster, gave the community his last name.

References

Unincorporated communities in Macon County, Missouri
Unincorporated communities in Missouri